Jimmy Martin is a former 7 time US National Champion in judo, and a two-time Olympian for judo.  He is a former Black Belt Magazine Competitor of the year for Judo.

References

American male judoka
Olympic judoka of the United States
Living people
Year of birth missing (living people)
Pan American Games medalists in judo
Pan American Games silver medalists for the United States
Judoka at the 1983 Pan American Games
Sambokas at the 1983 Pan American Games